Theodore George Bentley Osborn (2 October 1887 – 3 June 1973) was a botanist, ecologist and academic.

Early life
Osborn was born at Great Clacton, Essex, England, son of John Ashton Osborn, a schoolmaster, and his wife Harriet Mary, née Andrew. Sometime later the family moved to Burnley, Lancashire where his father worked at the Grammar School. Osborn attended Burnley Grammar School and then from 1905 went to the Victoria University of Manchester on a scholarship, and won first-class honours in botany (B.Sc., 1908).

Career
In May 1912 he was appointed Professor of Botany, Vegetable Pathology, and Parasitology at the University of Adelaide in 1912, and both Osborn and his wife were admitted BSc ad eundum at the same ceremony.

In 1928 Osborn accepted the chair of botany at the University of Sydney; he studied the coastal vegetation of New South Wales. Osborn was dean of the faculty of science from 1930 to 1933 and a fellow of the university senate from 1931. In 1937 Osborn became Sherardian Professor of Botany at the University of Oxford, was elected fellow of Magdalen College and admitted to the degree of M.A.

On retiring in 1953, Osborn returned to Australia and lived mostly in Adelaide until his death.

In 1958, Osborn was awarded the Clarke Medal of the Royal Society of New South Wales.

References
Rutherford Robertson, 'Osborn, Theodore George Bentley (1887 - 1973)', Australian Dictionary of Biography, Vol. 11, MUP, 1988, pp 99–100.

1887 births
1973 deaths
20th-century Australian botanists
20th-century British botanists
People from Burnley
Sherardian Professors of Botany
Academic staff of the University of Sydney